Subsolid personality is a personality type which lacks firmness and own identity. The want of a kernel of personality prevents co-ordination in the person's strivings.

A subsolid person senses anxiously how the environment reacts on his or her doings; the person adopts the color of the environment and chooses or is influenced by the way of appearing that serves him or her best. The actions of the person lack consistency and the emotional life is labile. The subsolid person is the charmer and the hysteric - happy and successful as long as he or she is able to be hooked on the psychological climate of the environment. But the person is fickle, like a chameleon, and reacts docilely and sensitively on predominant opinions and absorbs them. Lacking actual own substance, adapting a pose is what becomes important; he or she gets a need to dramatize and attract attention.

 The subsolid person is assessed as quick, agile, histrionic, unpredictable, subjective, and impulsive; (Millon, Theodore, 2011, Disorders of Personality)

The concept originates from Henrik Sjöbring's personality model, developed in Personality Structure and Development: A Model and its Application, (Copenhagen 1973).

References

Personality typologies